Gazi M M Amjad Hossain (11 November 1949 – 18 April 2021) was a Bangladesh Awami League politician and the incumbent Member of Parliament from Sirajganj-3.

Early life
Hossain was born on 11 November 1949 in Magura Binod, Tarash Upazila, Sirajganj District.

Career
Hossain was elected to Parliament on 5 January 2014 from Sirajganj-3 as a Bangladesh Awami League candidate.

Death 
Gazi died on 18 April 2021 at a hospital in Sirajganj District.

References

Awami League politicians
2021 deaths
1949 births
10th Jatiya Sangsad members
People from Sirajganj District